Enja Records is a German jazz record company and label based in Munich which was founded by jazz enthusiasts Matthias Winckelmann and Horst Weber in 1971.

The label's first release was by Mal Waldron, and early releases included European and Japanese avant-garde artists such as Alexander von Schlippenbach, Terumasa Hino, Albert Mangelsdorff and Yosuke Yamashita, along with newer American jazz musicians like Archie Shepp, Cecil Taylor, Leroy Jenkins and Eric Dolphy and straight-ahead musicians such as Tommy Flanagan, McCoy Tyner, Chet Baker, Freddie Hubbard, Elvin Jones, and Kenny Barron. The label also branched out to release early world music productions from Abdullah Ibrahim, Rabih Abou-Khalil, Mahmoud Turkmani, Gypsy bands, Indonesia's Monica Akihary, and Turkish saz virtuoso Taner Akyol.

Discography

Main series
{| class="wikitable sortable"
|- "
!Catalog !! Artist !! Album 
|-
| 2004 ||  || Black Glory
|-
| 2006 ||  || Live in Tokyo
|-
| 2008 ||  || Trinity
|-
| 2010 ||  || Vibrations
|-
| 2012 ||  || Payan
|-
| 2016 ||  || Impact
|-
| 2018 ||  || Bass Is
|-
| 2020 ||  || After Hours
|-
| 2022 ||  || With Silence
|-
| 2026 ||  || African Sketchbook
|-
| 2028 ||  || Taro's Mood
|-
| 2030 || Various Artists || Live at the Festival
|-
| 2032 ||  || African Space Program
|-
| 2034 ||  || Up Popped the Devil
|-
| 2036 ||   || Live at the Village Vanguard
|-
| 2038 ||  || Live at Pio's
|-
| 2040 ||  || Songs for Love
|-
| 2042 ||  || Makaya & the Tsotsis
|-
| 2044 ||  || Drifting
|-
| 2046 ||  || Hill Country Suite
|-
| 2048 ||  || Good News from Africa
|-
| 2050 ||  || Hard Talk
|-
| 2052 ||  || Clay
|-
| 2054 ||  || Lament for Booker Ervin
|-
| 2056 ||  || Father Time
|-
| 2058 ||  || Social Sketches
|-
| 2060 ||  || Julian
|-
| 2062 ||  || A Touch of the Blues
|-
| 2064 ||  || Spontaneous
|-
| 2066 ||  || Distant Thunder
|-
| 2068 ||  || Futures Passed
|-
| 2070 ||  || The Children of Africa
|-
| 2072 ||  || Sequoia Song
|-
| 2074 ||  || Twelfth & Pingree
|-
| 2076 ||  || Steam
|-
| 2078 ||  || Dream Bells
|-
| 2080 ||  || Banslikana
|-
| 2082 ||  || Islands
|-
| 2084 ||  || Dark to Themselves
|-
| 2086 ||  || Nuit Africaine
|-
| 2088 ||  || Eclypso
|-
| 2090 ||  || Now Hear This
|-
| 2092 ||  with Steve Lacy || One-Upmanship
|-
| 2094 || New York Jazz Quartet || Surge
|-
| 2096 ||  || Double Image
|-
| 2098 ||  and Eddie Gómez || Outlaws
|-
| 3001 ||  || Inner Space
|-
| 3003 || Revolutionary Ensemble || Revolutionary Ensemble
|-
| 3005 ||  || Air Above Mountains
|-
| 3007/09 ||  || The Berlin Concerts
|-
| 3011 ||  || Hannibal in Antibes
|-
| 3013 ||  || John Scofield Live
|-
| 3015 ||  || Chartreuse
|-
| 3017 ||  Quintet with Bennie Wallace || Close Encounter
|-
| 3019 ||  || Music from the Source
|-
| 3021/23 ||  || Moods
|-
| 3025 || New York Jazz Quartet || Blues for Sarka
|-
| 3027 ||  || Children of the Night
|-
| 3029 ||  || The Fourteen Bar Blues
|-
| 3031 ||  || Ballads & Blues
|-
| 3033 ||  || Rough House
|-
| 3035 ||  and Aladár Pege || Synchronicity
|-
| 3037 ||  || Barcelona
|-
| 3039 ||  Quartet || Africa: Tears and Laughter
|-
| 3041 ||  || Compassion
|-
| 3043 ||  || Common Cause
|-
| 3045 ||  || Live at the Public Theater
|-
| 3047 ||  (Dollar Brand) and Johnny Dyani || Echoes from Africa
|-
| 3049 ||  || Mingus in Europe Volume I
|-
| 3051 ||  || Conjunction
|-
| 3053 ||  || Ivory Forest
|-
| 3055 ||  || Stockholm Sessions
|-
| 3057 ||  || A Tribute to Mal Waldron
|-
| 3059 ||  || Super-Session
|-
| 3061 ||  || Beyond the Forest of Mirkwood
|-
| 3063 ||  || The Free Will
|-
| 3065 ||  || The Opal Heart
|-
| 3067 ||  || Winter Rose
|-
| 3069 ||  || Blues in Orbit
|-
| 3071 ||  || Talisman
|-
| 3073 ||  || Inside Story
|-
| 3075 ||  || Mingus Lives
|-
| 3077 ||  || Mingus in Europe Volume II
|-
| 3079 ||  (Dollar Brand) || Live at Montreux
|-
| 3081 || , Tommy Flanagan and Red Mitchell || Three for All
|-
| 3083 || New York Jazz Quartet || Oasis
|-
| 3085 ||  || The Angels of Atlanta
|-
| 3087 ||  || Heartbop
|-
| 3089 ||  || Of the Wind's Eye
|-
| 3091 ||  || Bennie Wallace Plays Monk
|-
| 3093 ||  || Gene Ammons in Sweden
|-
| 3095 ||  || Outpost
|-
|3097 ||  || Jaw's Blues
|-
| 3099 ||  || Live at the Jazz Showcase, Chicago Vol.1
|- 
| 4002 ||   || Dance
|-
| 4004 ||  || Shinola
|-
| 4006 ||  Quintet || Speak with a Single Voice
|-
| 4008 ||  || Search for Tomorrow
|-
| 4010 ||  || What It Is
|- 
| 4012 ||  Trio || Song for Hope
|-
| 4014 ||  || Confirmation
|-
| 4016 ||  || Peace
|-
| 4018 ||  || Lotus Flower
|-
| 4020 ||  || Introducing Pat Peterson
|- 
| 4022 ||  || Giant Steps
|- 
| 4024 || Slickaphonics || Wow Bag
|-
| 4026 ||  || Cowboys, Cartoons & Candy
|- 
| 4028 ||  Trio and Chick Corea || Mystic Bridge
|- 
| 4030 ||  (Dollar Brand} || African Dawn
|- 
| 4032 ||  || Cloudburst
|- 
| 4034 ||  || Perdido
|- 
| 4036 ||  || Non Troppo
|- 
| 4038 ||  || Out Like a Light
|- 
| 4040 ||  & The Fort Apache Band || The River Is Deep
|- 
| 4042 ||  || Body & Soul
|- 
| 4044 ||  || Mighty Lights
|- 
| 4046 ||  || Big Jim's Tango
|- 
| 4048 ||  || Swinging Macedonia
|- 
| 4050 ||  || Soul Song
|- 
| 4052 ||  || Thelonica
|-
| 4054 ||  || Calcutta Meditation
|-
| 4056 ||  (Dollar Brand} || Zimbabwe
|- 
| 4058 ||  || When I'm Singing
|-
| 4060 ||  || Talking to the Sun
|- 
| 4062 || Slickaphonics || Modern Life
|-
| 4064 ||  || Return of the Turtle
|- 
| 4066 ||  & The Trick Bag || It's in the Bag
|- 
| 4068 ||  || Wings
|-
| 4070 ||  || The Heartland Consort
|-
| 4072 || Conexión Latina || Calorcito
|- 
| 4074 ||  || Long as You're Living
|-
| 4076 ||  || Pannonica
|-
| 4078 ||  || Sweeping Through the City
|-
| 4080 ||  || Green River
|-
| 4082 ||  || Advance
|-
| 4084 || , Hannibal & Friends || More Sightings
|-
| 4086 ||  || Split Image
|-
| 4088 ||  || In Concert
|-
| 4090 ||  and Benny Bailey || The Upper Manhattan Jazz Society
|-
| 4092 ||  || Scratch
|-
| 4094 ||  || Autumn Song
|-
| 4096 ||  || Tentets
|-
| 4098 ||  || Old Bottles - New Wine
|-
| 5001 || Blue Box || Sweet Machine
|-
| 5003/4 ||  and Hōzan Yamamoto || Bolero
|-
| 5005 ||  || Strollin'
|-
| 5007 ||  || South Africa
|-
| 5009 ||  || Midnight Candy
|-
| 5011 ||  and Red Mitchell || The Duke and Basie
|-
| 5013 ||  || What If?
|-
| 5015 ||  || Bushman Song
|-
| 5017 ||  || Shades of Change
|-
| 5019 ||  || Birdland Stomp
|-
| 5021 ||  || Mal Waldron Plays the Blues
|-
| 5023 || Conexión Latina || Un Poco Loco
|-
| 5025 || Blue Box || Stambul Boogie
|-
| 5027 ||  || Memories of Pannonia
|-
| 5029 ||  || Dreamsville
|-
| 5031 ||  || Wings and Air
|-
| 5033 ||  || Nightworks
|-
| 5035 ||  and Friends || Movies
|-
| 5037 ||  || It Just So Happens
|-
| 5039 ||  || Quintessence
|-
| 5041 ||  || The Current Set
|-
| 5043 ||  ||  Dakota Song
|-
| 5045 ||  || Vintage Dolphy
|-
| 5047 ||  || Seventh Quadrant
|-
| 5049 || Joint Venture || Joint Venture
|-
| 5051 ||  || Countin' the Blues
|-
| 5053 ||  || Overcome
|-
| 5055 ||  || Secret Cosmos
|-
| 5057 || Reflexionen || Remember to Remember
|-
| 5059 ||  and Lee Konitz || Art of the Duo
|-
| 5061 ||  and Arthur Blythe || Pale Fire
|-
| 5063 ||  || Angelica
|-
| 5065 ||  || Pliant Plaint
|-
| 5067 ||  || Red White Black and Blue
|-
| 5069 ||  & Elephantrombones || Live at Leverkusen
|-
| 5071 ||  || Live at Fat Tuesdays
|-
| 5073 ||  || Mindif
|-
| 5075 ||  and Aki Takase || Looking for Love
|-
| 5077 ||  || Straight Ahead
|-
| 5079 ||  || Movies Too
|-
| 5081 ||  || Blues Bred in the Bone
|-
| 5083 ||  || Cherry Bat
|-
| 5085 ||  || Code Violations
|-
| 5087 ||  || The Path
|-
| 5089 ||  || Manhattan Melody
|- 
| 5091 ||  and Quintessesnce || Contrast High
|-
| 5093 ||  || Secrets
|-
| 5095 ||  & Fort Apache Band || Obalata
|-
| 5097 ||  || My Favourite Songs
|-
| 5099 ||  || Underneath It All
|-
| 6002 ||  || The City
|-
| 6004 ||  Concert Band || First Prize
|-
| 6006 ||  || A Jazz Song Book
|-
| 6008 ||  || Live at Sweet Basil
|-
| 6010 ||  || Still Waters
|-
| 6012 ||  || Abbey Sings Billie
|-
| 6014 ||  Orchestra || Times of Devastation/Poco a Poco
|-
| 6016 ||  || Desert Blue 
|-
| 6018 ||  & Ekaya || African River
|-
| 6020 ||  || Straight from the Heart
|-
| 6022 ||  || Love Light
|-
| 6024 ||  || The Traveller's Tale 
|-
| 6026 ||  || Breath
|-
| 6028 ||  || Live at the Showcase, Chicago Vol. 2
|-
| 6030 ||  || All the Way to Sendai
|-
| 6032 ||  || Wide Open Space
|-
| 6034 ||  || Phoenix
|-
| 6036 ||  || European Suite
|-
| 6038 ||  Trio || Serious Fun
|-
| 6040 ||  || One Bright Glance
|-
| 6042 ||  and Red Mitchell || Jive at Five
|-
| 6044 ||  || Live at the Royal Festival Hall
|-
| 6046 ||  || Avenue "U"
|-
| 6048 ||  || Signals 
|-
| 6050 ||  || Hot Stuff
|-
| 6052 || Joint Venture || Ways
|-
| 6054 ||  || Curves
|-
| 6056 || Association Urbanique || Don't Look Back
|-
| 6058 ||  || Incognito
|-
| 6062 ||  || Shima Shoka
|-
| 6064 ||  || Under the Wire
|-
| 6066 ||  || Survivors
|-
| 6068 ||  || There Was a Time: Echo of Harlem
|-
| 6070 ||  || Music for Symphony and Jazz Band
|-
| 6072 ||  || Blues 'n Dues Et Cetera
|-
| 6074 ||  || The Last Great Concert
|-
| 6076 ||  Itchy Fingers || Live
|-
| 6078 ||  Orchestra || At the End of the Universe
|-
| 6080 ||  || Remembering John
|-
| 6082 ||  || Weather Clear, Track Fast
|-
| 6084 ||  Quintet || Quickstep
|-
| 6086 ||  || Northern Summit
|-
| 6088 ||  ||Hipmotism
|-
| 6090 ||  || Al-Jadida
|-
| 6092 ||  || Side by Side
|-
| 6094 ||  || Sequestered Days
|-
| 6096 || , Aki Takase and Niels Pedersen || Alice
|-
| 6098 ||  Trio || Silencer
|-
| 7000 || Various Artists || 20th Anniversary!
|-
| 7001 ||  & Grupo Cal Viva || Sol
|-
| 7003 ||  || Mythology
|-
| 7005 ||  || The Children of Ibeji
|-
| 7007 ||  and Richard Davis || Body and Soul
|-
| 7009 ||  || In Europe
|-
| 7011 ||  || Desert Flowers
|-
| 7013 ||  || Sounds of Joy
|-
| 7015 ||  || Southern Touch
|-
| 7017 ||  || Mr. A.T.
|-
| 7019 ||  || Attack the Future
|-
| 7021/22 ||  || To the Max!
|-
| 7023 ||  and Niels-Henning Ørsted Pedersen || Spanish Nights
|-
| 7025 ||  || Topsy – Standard Book
|-
| 7027 ||  Quintet featuring Vincent Herring || The Old Country
|-
| 7029 || , Dave Holland, Ed Blackwell || Crystal Fire
|-
| 7031 || 's New Jungle Orchestra featuring David Murray || The Jazzpar Prize
|-
| 7033 ||  and Vitold Rek || Satisfaction
|-
| 7035 ||  Quintet with Glenn Ferris || Tomorrow
|-
| 7037 ||  || Abbey Sings Billie Volume 2
|-
| 7039 ||  and David Murray || Blue Monk
|-
| 7041 ||  || Extended Animation
|-
| 7043 ||  || That's Me
|-
| 7045 ||  || Spirit Willie
|-
| 7047 ||  || Soul Eyes
|-
| 7049 || Joint Venture || Mirrors
|-
| 7051 ||  || Youngblood  
|-
| 7053 ||  || Blue Camel
|-
| 7055 || Conexión Latina || Mambo 2000: Live
|-
| 7057 ||  || The Song of Songs
|-
| 7059 ||  || A Class Act
|-
| 7061 ||  || As Time Goes By
|-
| 7063 ||  Trio || Tough Customer
|-
| 7065 ||  || Live at the Blue Note
|-
| 7067 ||  || Duet in Detroit
|-
| 7069 ||  || Harvest
|-
| 7071 || Sun Ra and His Omniverse Arkestra || Destination Unknown
|-
| 7073 ||  || Choices
|-
| 7075 ||  || Close Up of Japan
|-
| 7077 ||  || Stairway
|-
| 7079 ||  Funk Project || Listen Here!
|-
| 7081 ||  and Takehisa Tanaka || When I Was at Aso-Mountain
|-
| 7083 ||  || Tarab
|-
| 7085 || Itchy Fingers || Full English Breakfast
|-
| 7087 ||  Orchestra || The Cortège
|-
| 7089 ||  Project || What It Is? Ed Blackwell Project Vol. 1
|-
| 7091 ||  || The Talk of the Town
|-
| 7093 ||  || Wood Music
|-
| 7095 ||  || Going Home
|-
| 7097 ||  || Double Rainbow
|-
| 7099 ||  || Long to Be Loose
|-
| 8000 || Various Artists || Trumpets in Modern Jazz
|-
| 8002 ||  and Carolyn Breuer || Family Affair
|-
| 8004 ||  || Another's Point of View
|-
| 8006 ||  || Conversations
|-
| 8008 || Various Artists || Art of the Duo
|-
| 8010 ||  Quintet || In Focus
|-
| 8012 ||  || Malik At-Taqasim
|-
| 8014 ||  & Stir Up! || 2.26
|-
| 8016 ||  and Philip Catherine || Art of the Duo
|-
| 8018 ||  || Blues and Views
|-
| 8020 ||  || Yesterdays
|-
| 8022 ||  & Johannes Enders Quintet || Discoveries
|-
| 8024 ||  || Dance with It
|-
| 8026 || Porter-Praskin Quartet with Sal Nistico || Sonnet for Sal
|-
| 8028 || Hornstein Trio || Langsames Blau
|-
| 8030 ||  || It's There
|- 
| 8032 ||  || Humpty Dumpty
|-
| 8034 ||  || Live at Sweet Basil
|-
| 8036 ||  || Morning Song
|-
| 8038 ||  || Barefoot
|-
| 8040 ||  || Let's Play the Music of Thad Jones
|-
| 8042 ||  || Stepping Out
|-
| 8044 ||  || Soul Connection
|-
| 8045 ||  || Soul Connection Vol. II
|-
| 8046 ||  || Retroflection
|-
| 8048 ||  Jazz Orchestra || Evanesecence
|-
| 8050 ||  || Low Profile
|-
| 8052 ||  || Can I Hear a Motion
|-
| 8054 ||  Project || What It Be Like? Ed Blackwell Project Vol. 2
|-
| 8056 || , Masahiko Togashi and Masabumi Kikuchi || Triple Helix
|-
| 8058 ||  || Just Us
|-
| 8060 ||   || WW3
|-
|8062 ||   || Just 88
|-
| 8064 || 's Weather Clear, Track Fast || Hue and Cry 
|-
| 8066 ||  || It Don't Mean a Thing
|-
| 8068 ||  || Nucleus
|-
| 8070 ||  Alligatory Band|| Don't Mow Your Lawn
|-
| 8072 ||  || Songs and Moments
|-
| 8074 ||   || Closest to the Sun
|-
| 8076 ||   Orchestra || Time Fragments
|-
| 8078 ||  || The Sultan's Picnic
|-
| 8080 ||  || Softly as in a Morning Sunrise
|-
| 8082 ||   || The Vision
|-
| 8084 ||   || Morning Call
|-
| 8086 ||   || Diaspora
|-
| 8088 ||  , Vincent Seagal and Bruno Rousselet || Flesh and Stone
|-
| 8090 ||   Trio || Clapping Music
|-
| 8092 ||   || March Blues
|-
| 8094 ||   Trio || 13 Steps on Glass
|-
| 8096 ||   Quartet || Reverence
|-
| 8098 ||   || Real Song
|-
| 9000 || Various Artists || The Music Universe
|-
| 9001 ||   || Čzech It Out!
|-
| 9003 ||   || Momentum Mobile
|-
| 9005 ||   and Roswell Rudd || Woyzeck's Death
|-
| 9007 ||   || Time Changes
|-
| 9009 ||   || Supreme
|-
| 9011 ||  Double Trio || Green Dolphy Suite
|-
| 9013 ||   || Vernal Fields
|-
| 9015 ||   || Bebop City
|-
| 9017 ||   || Signature
|-
| 9019 ||   || Pasaporte
|-
| 9021 ||   & the NDR Big Band || The Legacy Vol. 1
|-
| 9023 ||   || Cary On!
|-
| 9025 ||   || New York Child
|-
| 9027 ||   || Anniversary
|-
| 9029 ||   || Rebop
|-
| 9031 ||   || When It's Time
|-
| 9033 ||   || R 'n' B
|-
| 9035 ||   || Point in Time
|-
| 9037 ||   || The Magician
|-
| 9039 ||   || You Got What It Takes
|- 
| 9041 ||   || Mel Martin Plays Benny Carter
|-
| 9043 ||   || 2 Drink Minimum
|- 
| 9045 ||   || Blue and Grey Suite
|- 
| 9047 ||   || The Balkan Connection
|- 
| 9049 ||   || Loopin' the Cool
|-
| 9051 ||   || Calling the Card
|-
| 9053 ||   || Jazz Africa
|- 
| 9055 ||   Alligatory Band || Heads and Tales
|-
| 9057 ||   || Alborea
|-
| 9059 ||  || Arabian Waltz
|- 
| 9061 ||  || Reviews
|- 
| 9063 || , Greetje Bijma and Pierre Favre || Freezing Screens
|-
| 9065 || Conexión Latina || La Conexion
|-
| 9067 ||  || Notes from the Underground
|-
| 9069 ||  Orchestra|| Coming About
|-
| 9071 || , Miroslav Tadić and Mark Nauseef || Loose Wires
|-
| 9073 ||  Quarteto featuring Cindy Blackman || Passagem
|-
| 9075 ||  || Advance
|-
| 9077 ||  || I Remember You: The Legacy Vol. 2
|-
| 9079 ||  || Pepper
|-
| 9081 ||  || Dancing by a Rainbow
|-
| 9083 ||  || Color Me Cairo
|-
| 9085 ||  || Junior Mance at Town Hall Vol. I
|-
| 9087 ||  Quartet || Black Mud Sound
|-
| 9089 ||  ||  Face Lift
|-
| 9091 ||  Trio || Ninety-Six
|-
| 9093 || Babamadu || Babamadu
|-
| 9099 ||  || Innocent Green
|-
| 9101 ||  Septet || Oriental Express
|-
| 9102 ||  || Canzoni
|-
| 9103 ||  || Blues for the Beast
|-
| 9104 ||  || Light Blue: Schlippenbach Plays Monk
|-
| 9105 ||  || Home Ground
|-
| 9106 || Scales Brothers || Our House
|-
| 9107 ||  || Theory of Strange
|-
| 9108 ||  Trio || Refugees
|-
| 9109 ||  and Rudi Mahall || Duet for Eric Dolphy
|-
| 9111 ||  || Jaywalker
|-
| 9112 || Voodoo Gang || Return of the Turtle
|-
| 9113 ||  || In Europe
|-
| 9114 ||  || Nadja
|-
| 9115 ||  || Julian
|-
| 9116 ||  || The Water's Rising
|-
| 9117 || Misery Loves Company || Athens Meets New York
|-
| 9118 ||  || Premonition: Solo Debut for Nylon String Guitar
|-
| 9120 ||  || Straight Horn
|-
| 9122 || Le Petit Chien || Woof
|- 
| 9124 ||  || All for One
|-
| 9125 || Monk'O Marok || Din Din Dan
|-
| 9126 ||  || Back Seat Driver
|-
| 9127 || , Eddie Gómez and Dannie Richmond || Live at the Public Theater
|-
| 9128 ||  and Quique Sinesi || Tango Para Charlie
|-
| 9129 ||  Special Septet || Guilty
|-
| 9130 ||  || St. Louis Blues
|-
| 9131 ||  || Inside Story
|-
| 9132 ||  Trio || Chrominance
|-
| 9133 ||  and Michel Godard || Tuba Tuba
|-
| 9134 ||  || Abbey Sings Billie Vol. I + II
|-
| 9135 ||  Trio || Dream of the Camel
|-
| 9136 || Zollsound Chamber Orchestra || Songs Closer to Silence
|- 
| 9137 ||  and Naziha Azzouz || Kanza
|-
| 9138 || Monk'O Marok || Au Plafond!
|-
| 9139 ||  and Harpacticoida || La Mer
|-
| 9140 ||  || Home Sweet Home
|-
| 9141 ||  and Mal Waldron || Left Alone Revisited
|-
| 9142 ||  || Me Rio
|-
| 9143 || Underkarl || Second Brain
|-
| 9144 ||  || Where You At?
|- 
| 9145 ||  and Quique Sinesi || Bajo Cero
|-
| 9147 ||  || Up Popped the Devil
|-
| 9148 ||  and Dave Bargeron || Tuba Tuba Tu
|-
| 9149 || 's Root 70 || Getting Rooted
|-
| 9150 || Monk'O Marok || Exotics & Specials
|-
| 9151 || Underkarl || Freemix
|-
| 9152 ||  || Aki Takase Plays Fats Waller
|-
| 9153 ||  || Hafla
|-
| 9154 ||  || Do It Now
|-
| 9155 || Borda / Bunka / Hecker || Orientación
|-
| 9156 ||  || Movable Clouds
|-
| 9157 ||  || The Cool Side Of The Pillow
|- 
| 9158 ||  || Yo!
|-
| 9162 ||  and The Good Boys || Procreation
|-
| 9164 ||  Jazzpat Quintet + 1 || The Jazzpar Prize
|- 
| 9165 ||  || Blush
|-
| 9166 ||  Septet || Swing Moral
|-
| 9176 ||  Trio || Route F
|-
| 9183 || Klima Kalima || Chasing Yellow
|-
| 9184 ||  Underkarl || Goldberg
|-
| 9188 ||  || Something Sweet, Something Tender
|-
| 9191 ||  || Turning Me Jazz
|-
| 9195 || Various Artists || El Último Aplauso: Life Is a Tango (Soundtrack)
|-
| 9196 ||  || My Foolish Harp
|-
| 9197 || , Bruno Rousselet and Ernie Odoom || Ferris Wheel
|-
| 9198 || Klima Kalima || Loru
|-
| 9199 ||  || Stay a While
|-
| 9300 || Various Artists || The Enja World of Jazz Ballads
|-
| 9301 ||  || Always Double Czech!
|-
| 9302 ||  || Tarantula
|-
| 9303 ||  || Sur Prise
|-
| 9304 ||  || Strings for Holiday
|-
| 9305 || Various Artists || Ballads
|-
| 9306 ||  || Too Close to the Pole
|-
| 9307 ||  || Round Trip
|-
| 9308 ||  Quartet || Nature of the Beast
|-
| 9309 ||  || A Morning in Paris
|-
| 9310 ||  || Off the Wall
|-
| 9311 ||  || Eeeyyess
|-
| 9312 ||  || Standing on a Whale Fishing for Minnows
|-
| 9313 ||  || Here on Earth
|-
| 9314 ||  || Legends
|-
| 9315 ||  || Saturn Returning
|-
| 9316 ||  || Pussy Cat Dues
|-
| 9317 ||  || Shiny Stockings
|-
| 9318 ||  || Fo Deuk Revue
|-
| 9320 ||  || Balkan Blue
|- 
| 9321 ||  || Birdland Birthday Live at 95
|-
| 9322 || Bassdrumbone || Hence the Reason
|-
| 9323 ||  || Ocre
|-
| 9324 ||  || Dangerous Rip
|-
| 9326 || Banda Città Ruvo di Puglia || La Banda
|-
| 9327 ||  and the Soldier String Quartet || Jazz Standards on Mars
|-
| 9328 ||  || Tribute to Art
|-
| 9329 ||  || The Meltdown
|-
| 9330 ||  || Odd Times
|-
| 9331 ||  || Light Breeze
|-
| 9332 ||  || Catability
|-
| 9333 ||  Orchestra || Bar Utopia
|-
| 9334 ||  || Oriental Bass
|-
| 9335 ||  || May I Feel
|-
| 9336 ||  and Wendell Harrison || The Battle of the Tenors
|-
| 9338 ||  || The H.e.a.r.t. Project
|-
| 9339 ||  || Jadu
|-
| 9340 ||  Lapis Lazuli Band || Funkorific
|-
| 9341 || , Peter Erskine and Michael Formanek || Relativity
|-
| 9343 ||  and Bobby Previte || In the Grass
|-
| 9344 ||  || Spectral Domains
|-
| 9345 ||  || Black Inside
|-
| 9346 ||  || Speed Life
|-
| 9347 ||  || Vision Quest
|-
| 9348 ||  || My Man in Sydney
|-
| 9350 || Various Artists || Ballads in Blue
|-
| 9351 || , Steve Swallow and Paul Motian || Three Guys
|-
| 9352 ||  || Bright Nights
|-
| 9353 ||  || Higher Grounds
|-
| 9354 ||  || Hope
|- 
| 9355 ||  || Creole Project
|-
| 9356 ||  || Someone to Watch Over Me
|-
| 9357 ||  || Moon Dancer
|- 
| 9358 ||  || The Orchestra of Smith's Academy
|- 
| 9359 ||  Bernard Struber Jazztet || Le Phare
|- 
| 9360 ||  || Yara
|-
| 9361 || ADD Trio || Sic Bisquitus Disintegrat
|-
| 9362 ||  || Castel del Monte
|-
| 9363 ||  || Girl Talk
|-
| 9364 ||  and Jean-Louis Matinier || Fuera
|- 
| 9365 ||  || Moment of Truth
|-
| 9366 ||  Pocket Brass Band || Where Home Is
|- 
| 9367 ||  || Malak
|-
| 9368 ||  Octet || The Ground Music
|-
| 9369 ||  || Words Within Music
|-
| 9370 ||  || Speaking in Tongues
|-
| 9371 ||  || Between Dusk and Dawn
|-
| 9372 ||  || Bukra
|-
| 9373 ||  || Roots and Sprouts
|-
| 9374 ||  & Movin' On || Shake, Shuffle & Blow
|-
| 9376 ||  Glad Days || Settings of William Blake
|-
| 9377 ||  Eric McPherson Quartet || Cause and Effect
|-
| 9378 ||  and Quintessesnce || Guardians of the Light
|- 
| 9379 ||  || Grazie Italia
|-
| 9380 ||  || Translucide
|-
| 9381 ||  and Conjunto Sol Naciente || Ori Batá
|-
| 9382 ||  || Toward, "To West"
|-
| 9383 || and Ocre ||Y2K
|-
| 9384 ||  || Round About a Midsummer's Dream
|-
| 9385 ||  || Book of Tells
|-
| 9386 ||  and Azul || Twist
|-
| 9387 ||  || For My People
|-
| 9388 ||  Quintet || Summer Days
|-
| 9389 ||  || Time Immemorial
|-
| 9390 ||  || Quiet Fire
|-
| 9391 ||  || Songs & Solos
|-
| 9392 ||  || Cherry
|-
| 9393 ||  Orchestra || Allégresse
|-
| 9394 || Absolute Ensemble and Kristjan Järvi || Absolution
|-
| 9395 ||  || Habanera
|-
| 9396 ||  || Song
|-
| 9397 ||  || Le Concerto Improvise
|-
| 9398 ||  || Invention Is You
|-
| 9399 ||  || Thorn
|-
| 9400 || Various Artists || The More We Know
|-
| 9401 ||  || The Cactus of Knowledge
|-
| 9402 || Conexión Latina || Mambo Nights
|-
| 9403 ||  || Gonna Go Fishin'''
|-
| 9404 ||  || Ama Tu Sonrisa|-
| 9405 || Italian Instabile Orchestra || Litania Sibilante|-
| 9406 ||  || Octet Plays Trane|-
| 9407 ||  || The Satchmo Legacy|-
| 9408 ||  || In My Dreams|-
| 9409 ||  || I Saw the Sky|-
| 9410 ||  || African Symphony|-
| 9411 ||  || The Fitting Room|-
| 9412 ||  || Electric Sufi|-
| 9413 || ' Open Loose || New School|-
| 9414 ||  and Ana Brandao || Diz|-
| 9416 ||  || Odd and Awkward|-
| 9417 || Ensemble Indigo || Reflection|-
| 9418 ||  || Navigatore|-
| 9419 ||  || Dedalo|-
| 9420 || New Art Saxophone Quartet || Songs and Dances|-
| 9421 || 's Latino Blue || A Latin Shade of Blue|-
| 9422 ||  Quintet || My Marilyn|-
| 9423 ||  || Deep in a Dream|-
| 9424 || Trio Ivoire || Trio Ivoire|-
| 9425 ||  || In Berlin|-
| 9427 ||  || Portrait|-
| 9428 ||  || Black Moments|-
| 9429 ||  || European Legacy|-
| 9430 ||  || Next Stories|-
| 9431 ||  || Castel del Monte II|-
| 9432 ||  || Balance|-
| 9433 || Enders Room || Monolith|-
| 9434 ||  || What Love Is|-
| 9435 || , Terry Riley || In C|-
| 9436 || Troubadours United || Road of the Troubadours|-
| 9437 ||  Unit || Treats for the Nightwalker|-
| 9438 ||  || Play|-
| 9440 ||  || Il Sospiro|-
| 9441 ||  || Latakia Blend|-
| 9442 || Ekrem & Gypsy Groovz || Rivers of Happiness|-
| 9444 ||  Orchestra || Days of Wine and Roses: Live at the Jazz Standard|-
| 9447 ||  || Fayka|-
| 9448 ||  and The Night Club Band || All the Way|-
| 9449 ||  || Absolute Fix|-
| 9450 || Various Artists || Ballads 3|-
| 9451 ||  || If|-
| 9452 ||  || The Long View|-
| 9453 ||  || Oh You Crazy Moon|-
| 9454 ||  || Confluences|-
| 9456 ||  || Chanson Irresponsible|-
| 9457 ||  Orchestra || The Future of the Past|-
| 9458 ||  & Azul || Look What They've Done to My Song|-
| 9459 ||  || Bar Jazz|-
| 9460 ||  || Colossus of Sound|-
| 9461 || Daniel Grossman and Jochen Striebeck || Through Roses|-
| 9462 ||  || Morton's Foot|-
| 9463 ||  and Javier Girotto || Terra Madre|-
| 9464 ||  || Entrmundo|-
| 9465 ||  and the Italian Instabile Orchestra || The Owner of the River Bank|-
| 9466 || Gutbucket || Dry Humping the American Dream|-
| 9467 ||  || Nuages|-
| 9468 || Markus Stockhausen, Ferenc Snétberger, Arild Andersen and Patrice Heral || Joyosa|-
| 9469 ||  || The Nearness of You|-
| 9470 ||  || Angel Eyes|-
| 9471 || Rosanna & Zelia || Aguas=Iguais|-
| 9472 ||  || Uwai|-
| 9473 ||  || Samba do Mar|-
| 9474 ||  Paradox Trio with Theodosii Spassov || Gambit|-
| 9475 ||  || Zakira|-
| 9476 ||  || A Celebration|-
| 9479 ||  || Journey to the Centre of an Egg|-
| 9480 ||  || Terronia|-
| 9481 ||  || Christmas Songs|-
| 9482 ||  || A Handful o' Soul|-
| 9485 ||  Trio || Nomad|-
| 9486 ||  || Liquid Gardens|-
| 9487 ||  || Yalelol|-
| 9488 || Trio Elf || Elf|-
| 9489 ||  || Samba Tzigane|-
| 9492 ||  || Minsarah|-
| 9493 ||  & Azul || Believer|-
| 9494 ||  || Songs for Sad Women|-
| 9499 ||  || Zamazu|-
| 9500 || Various Artists ||Ballads 4 the World|-
| 9501 ||  || I Ain't Looking at You 
|-
| 9502 ||  || Brazaventure|-
| 9503 ||  || Waitin' for Spring|-
| 9504 || Various Artists || Al Tarab: Muscat ʿŪd Festival|-
| 9505 || Various Artists || Ballads: Take Five|-
| 9506 ||  || Disorder at the Border|-
| 9507 ||  with Cholet Känzig Papaux Trio || Silver Blue|-
| 9508 || Various Artists || Al Tarab: Muscat ʿŪd Festival|-
| 9509 ||  || Prima del Cuore|-
| 9510 ||  || Birds of Passage|-
| 9511 ||  and Markus Stockhausen || Streams|-
| 9512 ||  & Jan Hammer Trio || Turtles|-
| 9513 ||  || Where Is There|-
| 9515 ||  Trio || Roots and Wings|-
| 9516 ||  Trio || Hill|-
| 9517 ||  and Minsarah || Deep Lee|-
| 9518 ||  Trio featuring Edu Lobo || Subsequências|-
| 9520 ||  || Em Português|-
| 9521 ||  || La Fiamma e il Cristallo|-
| 9522 ||  || Mighty Long Way|-
| 9523 || Alony || Dismantling Dreams|-
| 9524 ||  || Chet in Chicago|-
| 9525 ||  || Selection|-
| 9526 ||  || Lunar Tunes|-
| 9527 ||  || La Linea del Sur|-
| 9528 ||  || Stormproof|-
| 9530 ||  || Ya Sharr Mout|-
| 9532 || , Philip Catherine and Jasper Van't Hof || The Great Concert|-
| 9533 ||  || Sublim III|-
| 9534 ||  || Akokan|-
| 9535 ||  || Metamorflores|-
| 9536 || , Howard Levy and Jean-Louis Matinier || Silver & Black|-
| 9537 ||  Quartet || Here We Gong|-
| 9538 || Trio Ivoire with Chicwoniso || Across the Oceans|-
| 9540 ||  Trio and Marc Ribot || Ultime Cosmos|-
| 9542 ||  New Quartet || Live at the Village Vanguard|-
| 9543 ||  || 5ive Horns & Rhythm|-
| 9545 || Minsarah || Blurring the Lines|-
| 9546 ||  and Jef Neve || Face to Face|-
| 9548 || Manhattan Brass || New York Now|-
| 9550 || Various Artists ||Nu Ballads 
|-
| 9551 ||  Underground || Diaspora|-
| 9552 ||  Trio || The Dancer|-
| 9555 ||  || The Hour of Separation|-
| 9556 ||  || Beneath the Surface|-
| 9558 ||  with Biréli Lagrène || Djangologists|-
| 9559 ||  || Django Tunes|-
| 9560 ||  || Trouble in Jerusalem|-
| 9562 || Trio Elf || Elfland|-
| 9563 ||  || Méditerranées|-
| 9565 ||  || Live in Marciac|-
| 9566 || Ring Ensemble || Ring Ensemble|-
| 9567 ||  || Jake Remembered|-
| 9568 ||  Trio || Silencer|-
| 9569 || Doumka Clarinet Ensemble || Afar|-
| 9570 || Subtone || Morningside|-
| 9571 || Absolute Ensemble and Kristjan Järvi ||  Arabian Nights: Live at Town Hall NYC|-
| 9573 ||  Trio || Inside|-
| 9574 || , Thomas Morgan and Tyshawn Sorey || Quite Simply|-
| 9575 || 's Invocation ||Suno Suno|-
| 9576 ||  || Cycladic Moods|-
| 9577 ||  || Angelica|-
| 9578 ||  4et || Surprise!!!|- 
| 9581 ||  || Solo: The Marcevol Concert|-
| 9582 ||  || Long Way|-
| 9583 ||  || Cinéma Beyrouth|-
| 9584 ||  || Classics of My Soul|-
| 9585 ||  Bigband || Failure in Wonderland|-
| 9586 ||  || Biosphere|-
| 9587 ||  Orchestra || The Cortège|-
| 9589 || 's R*Time || Exploring the Vibe|-
| 9590 ||  || By Myself|-
| 9591 ||  Trio || Continuous Beat|-
| 9594 || Quest || Circular Dreaming|-
| 9596 ||  || Melanoia|-
| 9599 ||  and Mike Mossman || Late Night Coffee|-
| 9602 || Trio Elf || Amsterdam|-
| 9603 ||  || Venture Bound|-
| 9604 ||  || Live|-
| 9605 || Trio Elf || RMXD|-
| 9606 ||  with Strings || The Brandenburg Concert|-
| 9608 ||  || Beyond the Double Bass|-
| 9609 ||  || Standards Live ~ At The Village Vanguard|-
| 9610 || Organ Explosion || Organ Explosion|-
| 9612 || Le Café Bleu International || Plays Edith Piaf|-
| 9613 || Booom || Music from Videogames|-
| 9614 ||  Quartet || Xenon|-
| 9615 || , Donny McCaslin and Dan Weiss || Criss Cross|-
| 9616 || Le Café Bleu International || Tells Bedtime Stories|-
| 9617 ||  & Brandenburger Symphoniker || Whisper|-
| 9618 ||  Trio featuring Tim Hagans || Dedication|-
| 9619 ||  Group || The Tides of Life|-
| 9620 || Various Artists || Message to Attila: The Music of Attila Zoller|-
| 9621 ||  || Intents and Purposes|-
| 9624 ||  || After the Rain|-
| 9625 || 's Club Boogaloo || Monsoon Dance|-
| 9626 ||  || Cross / Ways|-
| 9627 ||  Trio featuring Michael Hornstein || But For Now|-
| 9628 ||  || Lang Tang|-
| 9630 ||  Melanoia || Labyrinth|-
| 9631 ||  || The Left Side of Life|-
| 9632 ||  || Summer Melodies|-
| 9634 || Organ Explosion || Level 2|-
| 9635 ||  Bigband || Of Monsters and Birds|-
| 9636 ||  Quartet || Books, Bottles & Bamboo|-
| 9637 ||  and Pasquale Stafano || Nocturno|-
| 9642 ||  || The World Peace Trion|-
| 9643 ||  Quartett || Obenland|-
| 9644 ||  Trio + Steve Potts || Song|-
| 9645 ||  || Balkan Union|-
| 9650 ||  Grand Angle || Terre de Sienne|-
| 9654 || Various Artists || The Exciting Jazz of the Early Seventies|-
| 9655 ||  || Cheers|-
| 9679 ||  and Pasquale Stafano || Mediterranean Tales|}

9902 2 Mal Waldron / Steve Lacy: One-Upmanship / Moods9904 2 Bob Degen: Sequoia Song / Chartreuse9906 2 Clark Terry / Red Mitchell: To Duke & Basie / When I'm Singing9908 2 Hal Galper: Now Hear This / Ivory Forest9910 2 Abdullah Ibrahim: Banyana – Children of Africa / Desert Flowers9912 2 Benny Bailey: Islands / Upper Manhattan Jazz Society
9914 2 Franco Ambrosetti: Heart Bop / Close Encounter9916 2 David Friedman: Future Passed / Of the Wind's Eye9918 2 John Stubblefield: Bushman Song / Countin' on the Blues9920 2 Attila Zoller: Cream Bells / Memories of Pannonica9922 2 Kenny Barron: What If? / Live at Fat Tuesdays9924 2 Ray Anderson/Slickaphonics: Wow Bag / Modern Life9926 2 Conexion Latina: Calorcito / Un Poco Loco9928 2 Jerry Gonzalez & Forth Apache Band The River Is Deep / Obatala9930 2 Leni Stern: Secrets / Closer to the Light9932 2 Ed Blackwell: What It Is / What It Be LikeOther series

blu-1000 2 Robert Pete Williams: Sugarfarmblu-1001 2 Thomas Shaw: Do Lord Remember Meblu-1002 2 Little Brother Montgomery: Bajez Copper Stationblu-1003 2 Bukka White: Baton Rouge Mosby Streetblu-1004 2 Eddie Taylor: Stormy Mondayblu-1005 2 Montreal Jubilation Gospel Choir: Highway to Heavenblu-1006 2 Montreal Jubilation Gospel Choir: Jubilation Iiblu-1007 2 Christian Willisohn: Boogie Woogie & Bluesblu-1008 2 Montreal Jubilation Gospel Choir Glory Trainblu-1009 2 Stephen Barry Blues Band: Blues Under a Full Moonblu-1010 2 Louisiana Red & Carey Bell Live At 55blu-1011 2 Lillian Bouté & Christian Willisohn: Lipstick Tracesblu-1012 2 Bryan Lee Jump Street Fiveblu-1013 2 Nick Woodland: Big Heartblu-1014 2 Montreal Jubilation Gospel Choir A Cappellablu-1015 2 Montreal Jubilation Gospel Choir Anniversary in Gospelblu-1016 2 Yvonne Jackson W. Maceo Parker: I'm Troubleblu-1017 2 Lillian Boutté: The Gospel Bookblu-1018 2 Montreal Jubilation Gospel Choir: Joy to the Worldblu-1019 2 Christian Willisohn: Blues Newsblu-1020 2 Lillian Boutté: The Jazz Bookblu-1021 2 Bryan Lee: Memphis Boundblu-1022 2 Montreal Jubilation Gospel Choir Looking Back (Jubilation Vi)
blu-1024 2 Al Jones Blues Band: Watch This!blu-1025 2 Christian Willisohn Trio: Blues on the Worldblu-1026 2 Christian Willisohn New Band: Heart Broken Manblu-1027 2 Nick Woodland Quartet Live Fireworksblu-1028 2 Montreal Jubilation Gospel Choir Hamba Ekhaya
blu-1029 2 Bryan Lee Live at the Old Absinthe House Bar – Friday Nightblu-1031 2 Big Allanbik Batuque Y Blues
blu-1032 2 Bryan Lee Live at the Old Absinthe House Bar – Saturday Nightblu-1033 2 Marty Hall: Who's Been Talkin'?blu-1035 2 Bryan Lee: Crawfish Ladyblu-1036 2 Nick Woodland: The Current That Flowsblu-1037 2 Nick Woodland Cult Factory Vol. 1 (Authentic Heads)
m M P-1 70886 2 Rabih Abou-Khalil: Between Dusk and Dawnm M P-1 70889 2 Rabih Abou-Khalil: Bukram M P-1 70890 2 Rabih Abou-Khalil: Roots and Sproutsr27-9153 2 Harvie Swartz: In a Different Lightr27-9154 2 Bebop & Beyond W. Joe Henderson Plays Thelonious Monk
r27-9163 2 Tim Eyermann & East Coast Off. Outside Insider27-9167 2 David Becker: In Motionr27-9169 2 Uncle Festive The Paper & The Dogr27-9170 2 Dizzy Gillespie / Bebop & Beyond Plays Dizzy Gillespie
r27-9171 2 Mark Egan: Beyond Wordsr27-9180 2 Scott Henderson /tribal Tech Illicit*tip-888801 2 Blue Box Captured Dance Floor
tip-888802 2 Kevin Bruce Harris: And They Walked Among Peopletip-888803 2 Vladimir Estragon / Three Quarks For Muster Marktip-888804 2 Intergalactic Maiden Ballet Square Dancetip-888805 2 Mike Westbrook: Off Abbey Roadtip-888806 2 Michael Gregory: The Way We Used to Dotip-888807 2 Kevin Bruce Harris: Folk Songs / Folk Talestip-888808 2 Greetje Bijma: Tales of a Voicetip-888809 2 Wolfgang Schmid / Kick, B. Cobham No Filterstip-888810 2 Abdullah Lbrahim (Dollar Brand): Mantra Modetip-888811 2 Mike Clark / Paul Jackson: The Funk Stops Heretip-888812 2 Abdullah Lbrahim (Dollar Brand): Water from an Ancient Welltip-888813 2 Blue Box Time We Signtip-888814 2 Mitch Watkins: Strings With Wingstip-888815 2 Abdullah Lbrahim (Dollar Brand): No Fear No Dietip-888816 2 Abdullah Ibrahim (Dollar Brand): Knysna Bluetip-888817 2 Intergalactic Maidenballet Gulftip-888818 2 Blue Box "10"
tip-888819 2 Okay Temiz: Magnet Dancetip-888820 2 Abdullah Ibrahim: Yaronatip-888821 2 Subruto Roy Chowdhury Bageshree
tip-888822 2 Raiz De Pedra With Egberto Gismonti Diario De Bordo
tip-888823 2 Ferenc Snétberger The Budapest Concerttip-888824 2 Paradox Paradoxtip-888825 2 Harald Haerter & Dewey Redman Mostly Livetip-888826 2 Abdullah Ibrahim: Cape Town Flowerstip-888827 2 Rikhy Ray: Mangalamtip-888831 2 Greenfish: Perfume Light, Singing Bluetip-888832 2 Abdullah Ibrahim: African Suitetip-888833 2 Paradox The Rist Secondtip-888834 2 Ferenc Snétberger: Obsessiontip-888835 2 Mahmoud Turkmani Nuqta
tip-888836 2 Abdullah Ibrahim: Cape Town Revisitedtip-888838 2 Lew Soloff: Rainbow Mountaintip-888839-2 Götz Atzmon & The Orient House Ensemble
tip-888340-2 Abdullah Ibrahim: Ekapa Lodumotip-888841-2 Gilad Athmon & Oriental House Ensemble: Nostalgicotip-888843-2 The World Quintet
tip-888845-2 Abdullah Ibrahim: African Magictip-888846-2 Nunu!: Con Almatip-888848-2 Gilad Atzmon Musik
tip-888849-2 Gilad Atzmon & Orient House Ensemble: Refugetip-888850-2 Gilad Atzmon: In Loving Memory of America Rising Sun Collection
rsc-0001 2 John Lee Hooker
rsc-0002 2 Big Mama Thornton
rsc-0003 2 Taj Mahal
rsc-0004 2 Nina Simone
rsc-0005 2 Archie Shepp
rsc-0006 2 Louisiana Red
rsc-0007 2 Esther Phillips
rsc-0008 2 Johnny "Big Moose" Walker
rsc-0009 2 Lightnin' Hopkins
rsc-0010 2 Chet Baker
rsc-0011 2 Louisiana Red A.o.yellowbird
yeb-7707 2 Marc Ribot's Ceramic Dog Party Intellectualsyeb-7710 2 Susi Hyldgaard: It's Love We Needyeb-7711 2 Roy Nathanson: Sotto Voce /Subway Moon''

References 

Record labels established in 1971
German record labels
Jazz record labels
Mass media in Munich